Way is an unincorporated community located in Madison County, Mississippi.

Way is located within the  Jackson Metropolitan Statistical Area.

History
The Allison's Wells Hotel—described as a stately structure with a large ballroom—was located in Way.  In 1948, the Mississippi Art Colony was organized at the hotel.  The hotel was destroyed by fire in 1963.

Camp Bratton-Green and the Gray Center, www.graycenter.org, both part of the Episcopal diocese, are located in Way, Mississippi.

References

Www.graycenter.org

Unincorporated communities in Madison County, Mississippi
Unincorporated communities in Mississippi